Giacomo di Castro (c. 1597–1687) was an Italian painter of the Baroque period. He was born at Sorrento. He was a pupil of Giovanni Battista Caracciolo, but afterwards worked under Domenichino when that master visited Naples to decorate the chapel of the Tresoro. He painted a Marriage of the Virgin, the Annunciation, and Archangel Michael expelling Lucifer from Paradise in Sant' Aniello in Sorrento.

References

1590s births
1687 deaths
People from Sorrento
17th-century Italian painters
Italian male painters
Painters from Naples
Italian Baroque painters